Desiree Casado (born August 18, 1985) is a former actress most notable for the role of Gabriela "Gabi" Rodriguez on Sesame Street, the daughter of longstanding main characters Luis and Maria. Casado took over the role in 1993 (being the first child actress hired to appear on Sesame Street). Casado got the role when the previous actress, Gabriela Reagan (the real-life daughter of the actress playing Maria, Sonia Manzano), told her mother she did not enjoy being on television. The character of Gabi has become a more integral part of the show's cast in the last couple of years, perhaps mostly to fulfill Sesame Workshop's need to sustain youth among the cast, as the old guard of the show ages. Casado's character of Gabriela is one of only a handful of Latino characters who have appeared on Sesame Street.

In addition to her role as Gabi, Casado appeared in various television commercials. Her film credits include I Like It Like That (1994), Bed of Roses (1996), Joe's Apartment (1996), Wishful Thinking (1997) and Gloria (1999). In 2004 she acted in her first starring role in the independent film Juicy.  According to her official Sesame Street cast biography, Casado loves to dance, especially Hip-Hop, and is taking ballet lessons. In 2012, she married Michael Miller.

References

External links

 Sesame Place: Sesame Place holds Healthy Habits Weekend
 Hollywood.com: Desiree Casado
 Biography from Sesame Place Official Website

1985 births
Living people
American people of Puerto Rican descent
American child actresses
American film actresses
American television actresses
21st-century American women